Anastas Hanania (1903 – 1995) was a Palestinian-Jordanian lawyer, judge, official and diplomat.

Hanania was educated at the Syrian Protestant College in Beirut (now the AUB) and the Law College in Jerusalem. He entered the world of Palestinian politics in the late 1930s and 1940s.

Career

After the 1948 Deir Yassin massacre, Hanania and his family left Palestine for Amman. During the 1950s, Hanania was one of the original signatories to the Constitution of Jordan of 1952, which remains the law of the land today.

Between 1960 and 1966, Hanania was Jordan's Ambassador to the United Kingdom and between 1968 and 1989, he was a Senator in Jordan's Upper House of Parliament.

Ministerial positions
Hanania held several cabinet positions in the Jordanian government including Minister of Finance, Minister of Justice and Foreign Minister

Personal life

Hanania's wife Claire Nashawati died in 2002. They had a son (heart surgeon Daoud Hanania) and four daughters (May, Lyne, Louly and Myr).

References

External links
 Prime Ministry of Jordan website
 The Jordanian Senate website (AR)

1903 births
1995 deaths
Palestinian diplomats
Members of the Senate of Jordan
Jordanian diplomats
Ambassadors of Jordan to the United Kingdom
Jordanian people of Palestinian descent
American University of Beirut alumni
Government ministers of Jordan
Communications ministers of Jordan
Construction ministers of Jordan
Agriculture ministers of Jordan
Foreign ministers of Jordan
Trade ministers of Jordan
Finance ministers of Jordan
Transport ministers of Jordan
Economy ministers of Jordan
Justice ministers of Jordan
Refugees ministers of Jordan